Charles Hicks Saunders (November 10, 1821 – December 5, 1901) was a Massachusetts politician who served on the Common Council, Board of Aldermen and as the Mayor of Cambridge, Massachusetts.  Saunders was the son of William Saunders, a housewright and cabinet maker in Cambridge, and Sarah Flagg. Through his Sarah Flagg Saunders, Charles Hicks Saunders was the great-grandson of John Hicks, an American Patriot killed by the British in Arlington, Massachusetts during the British retreat from Concord. He was married to Mary Brooks, née Ball, in 1849.  

The Saunders family home now houses the admissions offices for Lesley University in Cambridge.

External links

Notes

1821 births
1901 deaths
Mayors of Cambridge, Massachusetts
Massachusetts city council members
19th-century American politicians